Raskopino is a rural locality (a village) in Mayskoye Rural Settlement, Vologodsky District, Vologda Oblast, Russia. The population was 158 as of 2002. There are 3 streets.

Geography 
Raskopino is located 10 km west of Vologda (the district's administrative centre) by road. Kuleberevo, Kovyliovo is the nearest village Kozma creek

References 

Rural localities in Vologodsky District